The 2012 California Golden Bears baseball team is the representative of the University of California, Berkeley in the 2012 NCAA Division I baseball season.  The team plays their home games in Evans Diamond. They will enter the 2012 season after making the 2011 College World Series with a 35–21 record in 2011 and making the postseason three of the last four years.

Previous season
California finished the 2011 regular season as the #6 team in the Pac-12 Conference with a 25–21 record, and made it to the 2011 College World Series finishing tied for 5th place. The program also staved off elimination as a varsity program in 2011 by raising approximately 10 million dollars in a little more than a month. The funds raised were able to keep the California baseball program running and set up the Cal Baseball Foundation to try to keep the program running into perpetuity. The university also had planned to eliminate Rugby, Men's and Women's Gymnastics, and Women's Lacrosse, but enough funds were raised to save those programs as well.

Schedule
The season for California will begin on Friday, February 17 with a home game against Pacific with a three-game series, two of which will be in Berkeley.  Their longest home stand will be from March 13–22, and May 11–20 (8 home games), and their longest road trip was from March 20-April 7 (12 road games).  Their final game of the regular season will be on Saturday, May 27 in Palo Alto against arch-rival Stanford. In 2011, the California Golden Bears baseball team won an at-large berth to the 2011 NCAA Division I Baseball Tournament and advanced to the Super Regionals. California then swept Dallas Baptist in Santa Clara to clinch a berth to the College World Series for the first time since 1992. The Bears will look to repeat and build upon that success in 2012.

|- align="center" bgcolor="#bbffbb"
| 1 || February 17 ||  || 9–1 || #22 || J. Jones (1–0) || T. Lumby (0–1) || || 602 || 1–0 || Evans Diamond || W1
|- align="center" bgcolor="#bbffbb"
| 2 || February 18 || @ Pacific || 6–3 || #22 || M. Flemer (1–0) || M. Hager (0–1) || L. Scott (1) || 838 || 2–0 || Klein Family Field || W2
|- align="center" bgcolor="#bbffbb"
| 3 || February 19 || Pacific || 9–3 || #22 || L. Scott (1–0) || J. Matthews (0–1) ||  || 775 || 3–0 || Evans Diamond || W3
|- align="center" bgcolor="#ffbbbb"
| 4 || February 24 || @  || 7–4 || #22 || S. Stuart (1–0) || J. Jones (1–1) || J. Stassi (1) || 1,204 || 3–1 || Blair Field || L1
|- align="center" bgcolor="#bbffbb"
| 5 || February 25 || @ Long Beach State || 2–1 (10) || #22 || L. Scott (2–0) || J. Frye (0–1) || || 1,180 || 4–1 || Blair Field || W1
|- align="center" bgcolor="#ffbbbb"
| 6 || February 26 || @ Long Beach State || 2–1 || #22 || R. Strufing (2–0) || M. Theofanopoulos (0–1) || J. Maciel (1) || 1,308 || 4–2 || Blair Field || L1
|- align="center" bgcolor="#bbffbb"
| 7 || February 28 ||  || 5–3 || RV || J. Donofrio (1–0) || J. Remer (1–1) || T. Hildenberger (1) || 105 || 5–2 || Evans Diamond || W1
|- 

|- align="center" bgcolor="#bbffbb"
| 8 || March 3 ||  || 9–3 || RV || J. Jones (2–1) || N. Cassell (1–1) ||  || 505 || 6–2 || Evans Diamond || W2
|- align="center" bgcolor="#bbffbb"
| 9 || March 4 || Lehigh || 10–0 || RV || M. Flemer (2–0) || C. Gotzon (0–2) ||  || 355 || 7–2 || Evans Diamond || W3
|- align="center" bgcolor="#bbffbb"
| 10 || March 4 || Lehigh || 18–3 || RV || K. Porter (1–0) || L. Porter (0–2) ||  || 440 || 8–2 || Evans Diamond || W4
|- align="center" bgcolor="#bbffbb"
| 11 || March 6 ||  || 7–5 || #21 || J. Donofrio (2–0) || R. McGraw (2–2) || L. Scott (2) || 116 || 9–2 || Evans Diamond || W5
|- align="center" bgcolor="#bbffbb"
| 12 || March 9 || @ Nebraska || 11–8 (11) || #21 || L. Scott (3–0) || T. Huber (0–1) ||  || 2,723 || 10–2 || Haymarket Park || W6
|- align="center" bgcolor="#ffbbbb"
| 13 || March 10 || @ Nebraska || 12–5 || #21 || J. Keller (2–0) || M. Flemer (2–1) || || 5,298 || 10–3 || Haymarket Park || L1
|- align="center" bgcolor="#bbffbb"
| 14 || March 11 || @ Nebraska || 4–0 || #21 || K. Porter (2–0) || T. Lemke (1–1) || || 2,351 || 11–3 || Haymarket Park || W1
|- align="center" bgcolor="#ffbbbb"
| 15 || March 12 || @ Nebraska || 9–5 || #18 || T. Niederklein (2–1) || M. Theofanopoulos (0–2) || || 1,941 || 11–4 || Haymarket Park || L1
|- align="center" bgcolor="#bbbbbb"
|  || March 16 || #24 Oregon State ||  || #18 || colspan=4 | Postponed (rain); Rescheduled for March 17 || || Evans Diamond ||
|- align="center" bgcolor="#ffbbbb"
| 16 || March 17 || #24 Oregon State || 9–2 || #18 || B. Wetzler (4–0) || J. Jones (2–2) || || 493 || 11–5 || Evans Diamond || L2
|- align="center" bgcolor="#ffbbbb"
| 17 || March 17 || #24 Oregon State || 4–1 || #18 || D. Child (2–1) || M. Flemer (2–2) || T. Bryant (4) || 550 || 11–6 || Evans Diamond || L3
|- align="center" bgcolor="#ffbbbb"
| 18 || March 18 || #24 Oregon State || 13–5 || #18 || J. Fry (1–0) || K. Porter (2–1) || || 609 || 11–7 || Evans Diamond || L4
|- align="center" bgcolor="#bbffbb"
| 19 || March 20 || @  || 4–3 || RV || M. Theofanopoulos (1–2) || J. Remer (1–2) || L. Scott (3) || 112 || 12–7 || Benedetti Diamond || W1
|- align="center" bgcolor="#ffbbbb"
| 20 || March 23 || @  || 5–1 || RV || B. Rodgers (4–0) || J. Jones (2–3) || || 2,581 || 12–8 || Packard Stadium || L1
|- align="center" bgcolor="#bbffbb"
| 21 || March 24 || @ Arizona State || 3–2 || RV || M. Flemer (3–2) || T. Williams (5–1) || L. Scott (4) || 2,515 || 13–8 || Packard Stadium || W1
|- align="center" bgcolor="#ffbbbb"
| 22 || March 25 || @ Arizona State || 9–6 || RV || R. Ravago (1–0) || M. Theofanopoulos (1–3) || J. Barrett (3) || 1,741 || 13–9 || Packard Stadium || L1
|- align="center" bgcolor="#bbffbb"
| 23 || March 25 || @  || 7–6 || RV || M. Theofanopoulos (2–3) || T. Harlan (3–4) || || 1,319 || 14–9 || Pete Beiden Field || W1
|- align="center" bgcolor="#ffbbbb"
| 24 || March 30 || @ #25 Texas || 13–2 || RV || N. Thornhill (3–2) || J. Jones (2–4) || || 2,970 || 14–10 || Dell Diamond || L1
|- align="center" bgcolor="#bbffbb"
| 25 || March 31 || @ #25 Texas || 12–2 || RV || M. Flemer 4–2 || P. French (3–1) || || 3,582 || 15–10 || Dell Diamond || W1
|- align="center" bgcolor="#bbbbbb"
|  || March 31 || @ #25 Texas ||  || RV || colspan=4 | Cancelled (coaches' mutual decision) ||  || Dell Diamond ||
|- 

|- align="center" bgcolor="#bbffbb"
| 26 || April 1 || @ #25 Texas || 6–5 || RV || J. Donofrio (3–0) || H. Milner (5–4) || L. Scott (6) || 2,028 || 16–10 || Dell Diamond || W2
|- align="center" bgcolor="#bbffbb"
| 27 || April 5 || @  || 5–4 || RV || C. Muse-Fisher (1–0) || W. Strahan (2–1) || J. Donofrio (1) || 457 || 17–10 || Dedeaux Field || W3
|- align="center" bgcolor="#ffbbbb"
| 28 || April 6 || @ USC || 2–1 || RV || A. Triggs (3–3) || L. Scott (0–1) || || 918 || 17–11 || Dedeaux Field || L1
|- align="center" bgcolor="#ffbbbb"
| 29 || April 7 || @ USC || 3–2 || RV ||| W. Strahan (3–1) || J. Donofrio (3–1) || || — || 17–12 || Dedeaux Field || L2
|- align="center" bgcolor="#ffbbbb"
| 30 || April 9 || #5  || 19–6 ||  || S. Bloom (1–0) || K. Siomkin (0–1) || || 763 || 17–13 || Evans Diamond || L3
|- align="center" bgcolor="#bbbbbb"
|  || April 10 ||  ||  ||  || colspan=4 | Postponed (rain); Rescheduled for April 11 || || Stephen Schott Stadium || 
|- align="center" bgcolor="#ffbbbb"
| 31 || April 11 || @ Santa Clara || 8–5 ||  || C. Mendoza (1–0) || C. Muse-Fisher (1–1) || M. Deering (3) || 261 || 17–14 || Stephen Schott Stadium || L4
|- align="center" bgcolor="#bbffbb"
| 32 || April 13 ||  || 7–6 ||  || J. Donofrio (4–1) || A. West (4–3) || || 275 || 18–14 || Evans Diamond || W1
|- align="center" bgcolor="#bbffbb"
| 33 || April 14 || Washington || 5–2 ||  || M. Flemer (5–2) || Z. Wright (2–1) || || 694 || 19–14 || Evans Diamond || W2
|- align="center" bgcolor="#ffbbbb"
| 34 || April 15 || Washington || 5–3 ||  || J. Fredendall (1–2) || J. Jones (2–5) || || 881 || 19–15 || Evans Diamond || L1
|- align="center" bgcolor="#bbffbb"
| 35 || April 17 || Santa Clara || 4–0 ||  || C. Muse-Fisher (2–1) || P. Twining (3–3) || || 132 || 20–15 || Evans Diamond || W1
|- align="center" bgcolor="#bbffbb"
| 36 || April 20 ||  || 9–4 ||  || M. Theofanopoulos (3–3) || J. Pond (2–7) || L. Scott (7) || 183 || 21–15 || Evans Diamond || W2
|- align="center" bgcolor="#bbffbb"
| 37 || April 21 || Utah || 9–0 ||  || M. Flemer (6–2) || B. Duke (2–2) || || 578 || 22–15 || Evans Diamond || W3
|- align="center" bgcolor="#bbffbb"
| 38 || April 22 || Utah || 5–2 ||  || J. Jones (3–5) || M. Watrous (2–2) || J. Donofrio (2) || 705 || 23–15 || Evans Diamond || W4
|- align="center" 
| 39 || April 27 || @  ||  ||  || colspan=5 | Time: 6:00p PDT; Television: None; Radio: KNEW (AM 960), KALX (FM 90.7) || PK Park ||
|- align="center" 
| 40 || April 28 || @ Oregon ||  ||  || colspan=5 | Time: 2:00p PDT; Television: None; Radio: KNEW (AM 960), KALX (FM 90.7) || PK Park ||
|- align="center" 
| 41 || April 29 || @ Oregon ||  ||  || colspan=5 | Time: 12:00p PDT; Television: None; Radio: KNEW (AM 960), KALX (FM 90.7) || PK Park ||
|- 

|- align="center" 
| 42 || May 4 || @  ||  ||  || colspan=5 | Time: 7:00p PDT; Television: None; Radio: KNEW (AM 960), KALX (FM 90.7) || Bailey–Brayton Field ||
|- align="center" 
| 43 || May 5 || @ Washington State ||  ||  || colspan=5 | Time: 5:30p PDT; Television: None; Radio: KNEW (AM 960), KALX (FM 90.7) || Bailey–Brayton Field ||
|- align="center" 
| 44 || May 6 || @ Washington State ||  ||  || colspan=5 | Time: 12:00p PDT; Television: None; Radio: KNEW (AM 960), KALX (FM 90.7) || Bailey–Brayton Field ||
|- align="center" bgcolor="#d4dae4"
| 45 || May 11 || Arizona ||  ||  || colspan=5 | Time: 2:30p PDT; Television: None; Radio: KALX (FM 90.7) || Evans Diamond ||
|- align="center" bgcolor="#d4dae4"
| 46 || May 12 || Arizona ||  ||  || colspan=5 | Time: 1:00p PDT; Television: None; Radio: KNEW (AM 960), KALX (FM 90.7) || Evans Diamond ||
|- align="center" bgcolor="#d4dae4"
| 47 || May 13 || Arizona ||  ||  || colspan=5 | Time: 1:00p PDT; Television: None; Radio: KNEW (AM 960), KALX (FM 90.7) || Evans Diamond ||
|- align="center" bgcolor="#d4dae4"
| 48 || May 14 || Washington State ||  ||  || colspan=5 | Time: 2:30p PDT; Television: None; Radio: KALX (FM 90.7) || Evans Diamond ||
|- align="center" bgcolor="#d4dae4"
| 50 || May 18 || UCLA ||  ||  || colspan=5 | Time: 2:30p PDT; Television: None; Radio: KALX (FM 90.7) || Evans Diamond ||
|- align="center" bgcolor="#d4dae4"
| 51 || May 19 || UCLA ||  ||  || colspan=5 | Time: 1:00p PDT; Television: None; Radio: KNEW (AM 960), KALX (FM 90.7) || Evans Diamond ||
|- align="center" bgcolor="#d4dae4"
| 52 || May 20 || UCLA ||  ||  || colspan=5 | Time: 1:00p PDT; Television: None; Radio: KNEW (AM 960), KALX (FM 90.7) || Evans Diamond ||
|- align="center" 
| 53 || May 25 || @  ||  ||  || colspan=5 | Time: 5:30p PDT; Television: Fox Sports Net; Radio: KNEW (AM 960), KALX (FM 90.7) || Sunken Diamond ||
|- align="center" 
| 54 || May 26 || @ Stanford ||  ||  || colspan=5 | Time: 1:00p PDT; Television: None; Radio: KNEW (AM 960), KALX (FM 90.7) || Sunken Diamond ||
|- align="center" 
| 56 || May 27 || @ Stanford ||  ||  || colspan=5 | Time: 1:00p PDT; Television: None; Radio: KNEW (AM 960), KALX (FM 90.7) || Sunken Diamond ||
|-

Roster

References

California Golden Bears baseball team, 2012
California Golden Bears baseball seasons
Golden Bear